Amir Spahić (born September 13, 1983) is a Bosnian retired football player who last played for Śląsk Wrocław.

Playing career

Club
On 10 July 2009, Spahić moved to Śląsk Wrocław on a free transfer previously having played for Torpedo Moscow, FK Željezničar, Arminia Bielefeld and Austria Wien.

Personal life
Spahić is not related to Emir Spahić or Alen Spahić.

References

1983 births
Living people
Footballers from Sarajevo
Association football defenders
Bosnia and Herzegovina footballers
FK Austria Wien players
Arminia Bielefeld II players
SC Eisenstadt players
FK Sloboda Tuzla players
FK Željezničar Sarajevo players
FC Torpedo Moscow players
Śląsk Wrocław players
Premier League of Bosnia and Herzegovina players
Russian First League players
Ekstraklasa players
Bosnia and Herzegovina expatriate footballers
Expatriate footballers in Austria
Bosnia and Herzegovina expatriate sportspeople in Austria
Expatriate footballers in Germany
Bosnia and Herzegovina expatriate sportspeople in Germany
Expatriate footballers in Russia
Bosnia and Herzegovina expatriate sportspeople in Russia
Expatriate footballers in Poland
Bosnia and Herzegovina expatriate sportspeople in Poland